The Pianist is a 1991 film directed by Claude Gagnon.  It is based on the novel A Certain Mr. Takahashi by Ann Ireland.  The central premise of the film - in which two teenage girls develop a crush on, and begin stalking, a celebrated concert pianist - is very similar to the 1964 film The World of Henry Orient.

Plot
A newly arrived celebrated Japanese pianist Takahashi (Eiji Okuda) is spied on by two teenage neighbor sisters, Jean (Gail Travers) and Colette (Macha Grenon). A family reunion to announce that the parents will be managing an institution in China recalls their experiences in attempting to meet him, then interacting with him in a supposedly one time sexual experience — a ménage à trois. The father of the sisters imitates Colette is unaware that Jean has seen her at a New York City night club dancing with him. Colette visited Jean in New York City and makes explorations of the city on her own. Takahashi is to sign posters at an event in Vancouver where the parents of the sisters have relocated. Colette does not want to go to the signing on the reasoning that they all have changed. Colette comes clean that she has slept with him and does not want him to know that she is aware of their trysts. A former boyfriend of the sister's mother attends the reunion, and Jean has a tryst with him during the banquet. They go to the poster signing, are welcomed by him and invited to lunch. Following the lunch, he makes his goodbyes to the sisters and Colette indicates to him that they are still friends. His limousine drives away.

Cast
 Gail Travers
 Macha Grenon
 Eiji Okuda
 Dorothée Berryman
 Maury Chaykin
 Ralph Allison
 Carl Alacchi

External links
 
 
 
 

1991 films
Canadian drama films
English-language Canadian films
Films based on Canadian novels
Films about classical music and musicians
Films about pianos and pianists
1991 drama films
Films directed by Claude Gagnon
1990s English-language films
1990s Canadian films